The 2018 Milex Open was a professional tennis tournament played on green clay courts. It was the fourth edition of the tournament which was part of the 2018 ATP Challenger Tour. It took place in Santo Domingo, Dominican Republic between 8 and 13 October 2018.

Singles main-draw entrants

Seeds

 1 Rankings were as of 1 October 2018.

Other entrants
The following players received wildcards into the singles main draw:
  Víctor Estrella Burgos
  Emilio Gómez
  José Hernández-Fernández
  José Olivares

The following players received entry into the singles main draw using protected rankings:
  Santiago Giraldo
  Jürgen Melzer

The following players received entry into the singles main draw as alternates:
  Thomaz Bellucci
  Pedro Cachín

The following players received entry from the qualifying draw:
  Federico Coria
  Martín Cuevas
  Alejandro Gómez
  Juan Pablo Varillas

Champions

Singles

 Christian Garín def.  Federico Delbonis 6–4, 5–7, 6–4.

Doubles

 Leander Paes /  Miguel Ángel Reyes-Varela def.  Ariel Behar /  Roberto Quiroz 4–6, 6–3, [10–5].

External links
 Milex Open

2018 ATP Challenger Tour
2018